Matzen is a town in the commune of Matzen-Raggendorf, in the Gänserndorf District of the state of Lower Austria, Austria

Cities and towns in Gänserndorf District